Tomosina "Tom" Cawthorne-Artis (January 3, 1956 – May 1, 2007) was a comic book artist for DC Comics, Fleetway/Quality, and Marvel Comics throughout the 1980s and early 1990s. In 1991, he was a partner in Leadslinger Comics and illustrated their only original release, The Terror.

His DC, Marvel, and Fleetway/Quality work included The Spectre, Green Arrow, She-Hulk, Judge Dredd, and the Tailgunner Jo miniseries.

He was a fixture at Chambanacon, usually found in the consuite with his sketchbook.  Eulogized at Chambanacon 38.

Bibliography

Dark Horse Comics
 Hard Looks #6–7 (1993)

DC Comics

 Blackhawk vol. 3 #12 (1990)
 Green Arrow Annual #1, 3 (1988–1990)
 Hawk and Dove Annual #1 (1990)
 Justice League America #36 (1990)
 Justice League Quarterly #2 (1991)
 Justice Society of America #4, 6 (1991)
 Secret Origins vol. 2 #27 (Zatanna) (1988)
 Spectre vol. 2 #24–29 (1989)
 Tailgunner Jo #1–6 (1988–1989)
 Teen Titans Spotlight #20 (Cyborg) (1988)
 Wasteland #8 (1988)
 Web #1–6 (1991–1992)
 Who's Who in the DC Universe #3, 6 (1990–1991)
 Who's Who in the Impact! Universe #1–2 (1991)
 Who's Who in the Legion of Super-Heroes #6–7 (1988)
 Who's Who Update '88 #1–2, 4 (1988)

First Comics
 Grimjack #31 (1987)

Just Imagine Graphix
 Just Imagine Comics and Stories #3, 5 (1982–1983)

Leadslinger Comics
 The Terror #1 (1991)

Marvel Comics
 Amazing High Adventure #5 (1986)
 Avengers Spotlight #21 (Starfox) (1989)
 Sensational She-Hulk #18, 21–23 (1990–1991)
 X-Factor Annual #3 (1988)

References

External links
"Everything That Rises Must Converge" Peter B. Gillis remembrance of Tom Artis May 12, 2007

1956 births
2007 deaths
American comics artists